CeeDee Lamb is an American football player

CeeDee may also refer to:
 CeeDee Candy, repackager for Candy Buttons
 CeeDee Music UK, management for record label Angel Air 
 Ceedee, alternative name for Älpee album by Klamydia
 The CeeDees, music group whose album was produced by Steve Webster

See also 
 The Cactus Cee/D album by 3rd Bass
 CD (disambiguation)